The Manhasset Park District is a park district serving much of the Greater Manhasset area of Nassau County, Long Island, New York, United States. It is headquartered a 62 Manhasset Avenue, Manhasset, NY 11030.

History 
The Manhasset Park District was established in 1921.

In the late 1940s, there was a controversial, failed proposal to build a 3-acre park in the northern part of the Strathmore area of Manhasset. It was argued that all of Greater Manhasset would be paying for a park which only North Strathmore residents would be able to use. When the vote on the $45,000 (1949 USD) bond referendum was held, the referendum was rejected, and subsequently the Manhasset Park District would never build the park.

In 1974, the Village of Roslyn Estates unsuccessfully attempted to have the district's boundaries redrawn to include the village after the district added 260 parking spaces to the commuter parking fields at the Manhasset Long Island Rail Road station. Its Mayor, Robert D. Zucker, stated that Roslyn Estates residents preferred the Manhasset station over the closer Roslyn station due to the how service to/from Pennsylvania Station on the Port Washington Branch is direct, whereas a change at Jamaica is required on the Oyster Bay Branch. Roslyn Estates residents would have the ability to be guaranteed a parking space at the Manhasset station for commuting to/from Manhattan if the boundaries were redrawn to include the village. District and North Hempstead officials, along with Manhasset residents, were against redrawing the boundaries to include Roslyn Estates, given that Roslyn Estates is part of the Greater Roslyn area (as opposed to being part of Greater Manhasset), and felt that the needs of Greater Manhasset should be the Manhasset Park District's main focus.

In the 1990s, over 1,000 residents petitioned for the Strathmore Bath Club to be purchased by the Manhasset Park District to keep it operating as a public park. The plan was unsuccessful, and the club was demolished and replaced with single-family homes.

Service area 
The Manhasset Park District serves the following communities in Manhasset:

 Manhasset (including Strathmore)
 Munsey Park
 Plandome Heights
 Parts of Flower Hill
 Parts of North Hills
 Parts of Plandome Manor

List of parks 
The Manhasset Park District operates the following parks and recreational facilities:

 Four Acre Park
 Heroes' Plaza
 Park Avenue Park
 Patriot's Park
 Veterans of Foreign War

Manhasset LIRR parking lots 
The Manhasset Park District also maintains commuter parking lots at the Manhasset station on the Long Island Rail Road's Port Washington Branch.

See also 

 Great Neck Park District – Another park district on Long Island, in the adjacent area of Great Neck.

References

External links 

 Manhasset Park District official website

Manhasset, New York
Town of North Hempstead, New York
Special districts in Nassau County, New York
Park districts in New York (state)